is a Japanese football player. He plays for Grulla Morioka.

Career
Tatsuya Suzuki joined to J3 League club Grulla Morioka in 2016.

Club statistics
Updated to 22 February 2018.

References

External links
Profile at Grulla Morioka

1993 births
Living people
Meiji University alumni
Association football people from Saitama Prefecture
Japanese footballers
J3 League players
Iwate Grulla Morioka players
Association football defenders